Sakurajima (literally "Cherry Blossom Island") is an active stratovolcano, formerly an island and now a peninsula, in Kagoshima Prefecture in Kyushu, Japan.  The lava flows of the 1914 eruption connected it with the Ōsumi Peninsula. It is the most active volcano in Japan.

As of April 2021, the volcanic activity still continues, dropping volcanic ash on the surroundings. Earlier eruptions built the white sand highlands in the region. On September 13, 2016, a team of experts from Bristol University and the Sakurajima Volcano Research Centre in Japan suggested that the volcano could have a major eruption within 30 years; since then two eruptions have occurred.

Sakurajima is a stratovolcano. Its summit has three peaks, Kita-dake (northern peak), Naka-dake (central peak) and Minami-dake (southern peak) which is active now.

The mountain is in a part of Kagoshima Bay known as Kinkō-wan. The former island is part of the city of Kagoshima.

History

Geological history

Sakurajima is in the 25 km (15 mi)-wide Aira caldera, which formed in an enormous "blow-out-and-cave-in" eruption around 22,000 years ago. Several hundred cubic kilometres of ash and pumice were ejected, causing the magma chamber underneath the erupting vents to collapse. Sakurajima is a modern active vent of the same Aira caldera volcano.

Sakurajima was formed by later activity within the caldera, beginning about 13,000 years ago. Its first eruption in recorded history was in 963 AD. Most of its eruptions are strombolian, affecting only the summit areas, but larger plinian eruptions have occurred in 1471–1476, 1779–1782 and 1914.

Volcanic activity at Kita-dake ended around 4,900 years ago: later eruptions have been centered on Minami-dake. Since 2006, activity has centred on Showa crater, to the east of the summit of Minami-dake.

1914 eruption

The 1914 eruption began on January 11 and was the most powerful in twentieth-century Japan. The volcano had been dormant for over a century until 1914. 
Almost all residents had left the island in the previous days; several large earthquakes had warned them that an eruption was imminent.
Initially, the eruption was very explosive, generating eruption columns and pyroclastic flows, but after a very large earthquake on January 12, and another the day after, it became effusive, generating a large lava flow. The January 12 earthquake killed 35, and in total, 58 people died. Lava flows filled the narrow strait between the island and the mainland, turning it into a peninsula.
Lava flows are rare in Japan—because the silica content of the magmas is high, explosive eruptions are far more common—but the lava flows at Sakurajima continued for months.
The island grew, engulfing several smaller islands nearby, and eventually became connected to the mainland by a narrow isthmus. Parts of Kagoshima Bay became significantly shallower, and it made tides higher.

This showed that Sakurajima draws its magma from the same magma reservoir that fed the ancient caldera-forming eruption. The eruption partly inspired a 1914 movie, The Wrath of the Gods, centering on a family curse that ostensibly causes the eruption.

Recent activity

Sakurajima's activity became more prominent in 1955, and the volcano has been erupting almost constantly ever since. Thousands of small explosions happen each year, throwing ash to heights of up to a few kilometers above the mountain. The Sakurajima Volcano Observatory was set up in 1960 to monitor these eruptions.

Monitoring of the volcano and predictions of large eruptions are particularly important because it is in a densely populated area, with the city of Kagoshima's 680,000 residents just a few kilometers from the volcano. The city conducts regular evacuation drills, and a number of shelters have been built where people can take refuge from falling volcanic debris.

In light of the dangers it presents to nearby populations, Sakurajima was designated a Decade Volcano in 1991, identifying it as worthy of particular study as part of the United Nations' International Decade for Natural Disaster Reduction.

Sakurajima is part of the Kirishima-Yaku National Park, and its lava flows are a major tourist attraction. The area around Sakurajima contains several hot spring resorts. One of the main agricultural products of Sakurajima is a huge basketball-sized white radish (Sakurajima daikon).

An eruption had been expected following a series of smaller explosions over the weekend. It is not thought there was any damage caused.

An eruption occurred from the Minami-dake summit crater at 5:38 on Sunday, August 9, 2010, sending debris up to 5000 m (16,000 ft).

In 2011 and 2012, Sakurajima experienced several significant eruptions; volcanic activity continued into 2013.
Photographer Martin Rietze captured a rare picture of lightning within the ash plume in January 2013 during a magma ejection, which was a NASA astronomy pic of the day in March 2013.

On August 18, 2013, the volcano erupted from Showa crater and produced its highest recorded plume of ash since 2006, rising 5,000 metres high and causing darkness and significant ash falls on the central part of Kagoshima city. The eruption occurred at 16:31 and was the 500th eruption of the year.

In August 2015, Japan's meteorological agency issued a level 4 emergency warning, which urges residents to prepare to evacuate.
Scientists warned that a major eruption could soon take place at the volcano; it eventually did erupt around 20:00 on February 5, 2016.

After a long pause of eruptions at the vent, the eruptions abruptly stopped there and returned to the Showa crater, on April 4, 2016, some 8–9 days preceding major earthquakes on the Median Tectonic Line near Kumamoto, Japan. Then, three months later, on July 26, it spewed volcanic ash  into the air.

On October 3, 2020, at 07:35 UTC, the volcano erupted once again, this time from the Aira caldera. A volcanic ash advisory for aviation was issued by the Volcanic Ash Advisory Center Tokyo (VAAC) at 07:43 UTC, showing the ash cloud to be stationary and reaching FL100 (10,000 feet).

On July 24, 2022, at 20:05 JST, an explosive eruption occurred at the summit crater of the volcano, and cinders scattered up to 2.5 km from the crater. Following this eruption, at 20:50 JST, the Japan Meteorological Agency raised the eruption alert level from Level 3 to Level 5, the highest level, and urged maximum precaution and evacuation. This was the first time an eruption alert level 5 has been issued for Sakurajima.

On February 9, 2023, an eruption occurred at the Showa crater on Sakurajima at at 10:52 JST. The plumes had risen to 1000 meters at 11:10 JST, according to the Kagoshima Meteorological Office. People in a 2-km radius was sent a warning by the local weather observatory against pyroclastic flows and falling rocks.

Timeline

Culture
Sakurajima is the title of a 1946 short story, written by the Japanese writer Haruo Umezaki, about a disillusioned Navy officer stationed on the volcano island towards the end of World War II as American air force planes bomb Japan. The story is based on Umezaki's own experience; he was stationed in a military cipher base in the nearby Prefecture city of Kagoshima.

Sakurajima was also the name of Japanese singer Tsuyoshi Nagabuchi's song. After the concert, a statue showing Nagabuchi screaming with a guitar was installed on the site of the concert.

See also

 List of volcanoes in Japan

Notes

References
 Townley, S.D. (1915).  "Seismographs at the Panama-Pacific Exposition," Bulletin of the Seismological Society of America. Stanford, California: Seismological Society of America. 
 Teikoku's Complete Atlas of Japan, Teikoku-Shoin Co., Ltd. Tokyo 1990

Further reading
 Aramaki S. (1984), Formation of the Aira Caldera, Southern Kyūshū, ~22,000 years ago, Journal of Geophysical Research, v. 89, issue B10, p. 8485.
  Guide-books of the Excursions: Pan-Pacific Science Congress, 1926, Japan. Tokyo: Tokyo Printing Co. 
 Johnson, H & Kuwahara, S (2016), Sakurajima: Maintaining an island essence, Shima: The International Journal of Research into Island Cultures, vol. 10, no.1, pp. 48–66.

External links

 Sakurajima: National catalogue of the active volcanoes in Japan - Japan Meteorological Agency
 Sakurajima Volcano Research Center - Kyoto University
 Aira / Sakurajima, Global Volcanic Program
 Footage of the March 2009 eruption - BBC
 Schoolchildren in Kagoshima wearing helmets to protect against stones thrown out by the nearby Sakurajima volcano (which is in background)
 Schoolchildren and their teacher wearing helmets
 Google Earth air view
 Google Earth ground view approaching Sakurajima from the mainland
 Smithsonian Institution's Global Volcanism Program (GVP) (entry for Aira /Sakurajima)

Landforms of Kagoshima Prefecture
Volcanoes of Kyushu
Stratovolcanoes of Japan
Subduction volcanoes
Decade Volcanoes
Active volcanoes
VEI-6 volcanoes
20th-century volcanic events
Former islands
Volcanic eruptions in 2022